In a Colt's Shadow is a 1965 Italian Spaghetti Western film directed and written by Giovanni Grimaldi.

Story
Two professional gunfighters separate after they complete a job in a small Mexican town where they rid it of the Ramirez gang. Steve married Duke's daughter and tries to settle down to a peaceful life on a ranch outside a town controlled by Jackson and Burns.

Cast
 Stephen Forsyth - Steve Blaine
 Conrado San Martín -  Duke Buchanan
 Anna Maria Polani -  Susan Buchanan
 Helga Liné -  Fabienne
 Franco Ressel - Harold Jackson
 Virigilio Gazzolo -  Buck
 Aldo Sambrell -  Ramirez
 José Calvo - Sheriff
 Andrea Scotti -  Oliver
 Gino Cassani - Jim
 Franco Lauteri - Burns
 Tito García - Bartender
 José Rosello
 Xan das Bolas
 Javier de Rivera 
 Rafael Albaicín
 Hugo Blanco
 Sancho Gracia
 Hugo Ricardo
 Alvaro de Luna

References

External links 
 

1960s Italian-language films
Italian Western (genre) films
1965 Western (genre) films
1965 films
Spaghetti Western films
Films scored by Nico Fidenco
Films shot in Almería
1960s Italian films